Hartelholz is a  forest in the north of Munich, Germany.

It is located north of the Panzerwiese in the boroughs of Feldmoching-Hasenbergl and Milbertshofen-Am Hart.

It is classified as a Naturschutzgebiet protected area.

References 

Geography of Munich
Forests and woodlands of Bavaria
Nature reserves in Bavaria
Milbertshofen-Am Hart